Jividha Sharma  is an Indian actress known for her work in Hindi and Punjabi film industries.

Biography
Born to a Delhi-based Punjabi Brahmin family, Sharma made her film debut in the Tamil language romance Kaadhale Nimmadhi (1998). The next year, she played a supporting role in Subhash Ghai's musical drama Taal (1999). Her breakthrough came with the romantic action film Yeh Dil Aashiqanaa (2002). Directed by Kuku Kohli, it featured Sharma playing a terrorist's sister opposite Karan Nath. Rediff.com's reviewer wrote that she had "done a good job". That same year she played the lead role in Telugu film Yuva Rathna. A critic wrote for The Hindu that except the last few scenes, Sharma was "lifeless throughout". Full Hyderabad's reviewer noted that she was "one of those assembly-line heroines for Tollywood". A Hindi film Sila with her in the lead role was announced but never completed.

Mini Punjab (2009) marked Sharma's debut in Punjabi films and she was paired with Gurdas Maan. She followed this with The Lion of Punjab (2011), Yaar Annmulle (2011), Dil Sada Luteya Gaya (2013) and Dil Le Gayi Kudi Punjab Di (2015). The latter, a romantic film had her paired opposite Ashmit Patel.

Aruna Irani, the producer of Yeh Dil Aashiqanaa, cast Sharma for her TV serials Tum Bin Jaaoon Kahaan and Zameen Se Aasman Tak. The former was well received and dealt with the topic of life after death.

Filmography

Television

References

External links
 
Jividha Ashta at Greatfaces

Actresses in Hindi cinema
Actresses in Hindi television
Actresses in Punjabi cinema
Actresses in Tamil cinema
Actresses in Telugu cinema
Indian film actresses
Living people
Year of birth missing (living people)
Punjabi Hindus